Baczyn may refer to the following places:
Baczyn, Kraków County in Lesser Poland Voivodeship (south Poland)
Baczyn, Sucha County in Lesser Poland Voivodeship (south Poland)
Baczyn, West Pomeranian Voivodeship (north-west Poland)